Amblyseius chilcotti is a species of mite in the family Phytoseiidae.

References

chilcotti
Articles created by Qbugbot
Animals described in 1971